Salah Assad (born 10 June 1958, in Larbaâ Nath Irathen) is a former Algerian football striker and manager.

He played for RC Kouba, where he won an Algerian championship in 1981, and in France for FC Mulhouse  For Algeria national football team, he participated at the 1980, 1982, and 1986 African Cup of Nations, 1980 Summer Olympics, and at two edition of FIFA World Cup in 1982 and 1986, scored two goals.

Assad currently holds the record with Islam Slimani of most scored goals at the World Cup for Algeria, which were both scored in the 1982 World Cup. Slimani in 2014.

Biography
Salah Assad started playing young with JSM Cheraga and after with RC Kouba. In 1975, he played with the senior team until 1982 and he won the Algerian championship in 1981.

Career statistics

International goals 
Scores and results list Algeria's goal tally first. "Score" column indicates the score after the player's goal.

Honours

Club 
 Algerian League Champion in 1981 with RC Kouba

International 
 Gold medal in the 1978 All-Africa Games in Algiers
 Bronze medal in the 1979 Mediterranean Games in Split
 2nd in the final of the 1980 African Cup of Nations in Nigeria
 Quarter final round in the 1980 Summer Olympics in Moscow
 2 participations in FIFA World Cup of 1982 in Spain & 1986 in Mexico

Individual 
 Africa Cup of Nations Team of the Tournament:1980,1982
 Best left forward in 1982 FIFA World Cup
 2nd best African football player of the year in 1982

References

External links

1958 births
Living people
People from Larbaâ Nath Irathen
Kabyle people
Algerian footballers
Algeria international footballers
Algerian expatriate footballers
Association football forwards
Algeria youth international footballers
African Games gold medalists for Algeria
African Games medalists in football
Mediterranean Games medalists in football
Competitors at the 1978 All-Africa Games
RC Kouba players
JSM Chéraga players
FC Mulhouse players
Paris Saint-Germain F.C. players
Ligue 1 players
Expatriate footballers in France
Algerian expatriate sportspeople in France
Mediterranean Games bronze medalists for Algeria
Competitors at the 1979 Mediterranean Games
Olympic footballers of Algeria
Footballers at the 1980 Summer Olympics
1982 FIFA World Cup players
1986 FIFA World Cup players
1980 African Cup of Nations players
1982 African Cup of Nations players
21st-century Algerian people